The 1940 Marshall Thundering Herd football team was an American football team that represented Marshall University as an independent during the 1940 college football season. In its sixth season under head coach Cam Henderson, the team compiled an 8–2 record and outscored opponents by a total of 334 to 75. Jim Roberts and Andy D'Antoni were the team captains. Jackie Hunt set a new single-season college football record with 27 touchdowns scored.

Schedule

References

Marshall
Marshall Thundering Herd football seasons
Marshall Thundering Herd football